Cheshmeh-ye Ruy (also Romanized as Cheshmeh-ye Rūy) is a village in Esfarjan Rural District, in the Central District of Shahreza County, Isfahan Province, Iran. At the 2006 census, its population was 40, in 20 families.

References 

Populated places in Shahreza County